Anne Rosemary Smith (31 August 1941 – 9 November 1993), was a sprinter and middle distance runner, who specialised in the 1500 metres and mile events. She represented Great Britain and Northern Ireland at the 1964 Tokyo Olympic Games. In 1967, Smith broke two world records in one race, running 4:17.3 for the 1500 metres and 4:37.0 for the mile. These were the first 1500 m and mile world records to be ratified by the IAAF.

Career
Smith was born in Amersham, England. She was coached by Frank Mitchell and Gordon Pirie, Pirie had won silver in the 5000m at the Olympics in Melbourne in 1956 but Anne Smith's preferred distance, 1500m, did not become part of the Olympic Games programme for women until 1972.

She had begun running as a 17-year-old and won the WAAA's 880y title four times from 1964 to 1967.

At the 1964 Olympic Games in Tokyo, she reached the final of the 800 metres (women were not permitted to run any distance longer than 800 m at the time). She set a British record of 2:04.8 in the semi-final. In the final, she finished eighth in 2:05.1, the race was won by her teammate Ann Packer who recorded a world record of 2:01.1, second was France's Maryvonne Dupureur (2:01.9) and third was Marise Chamberlain of New Zealand (2:02.8).

In 1966, she won a bronze medal for England in the 880 yards at the Commonwealth Games in Kingston, she ran 2:05.0. The winner was Abby Hoffman of Canada (2:04.2), with Australia's Judy Pollock second (2:04.5).

Having set a British women’s mile record of 4:44.2 in 1966, Smith set a world record for the mile in May 1967, improving Marise Chamberlain's four and a half year old mark of 4:41.4, when she ran 4:39.2 to win the Surrey Championship at Wimbledon Park on 13 May, also setting a British record of 4:21.0 for the 1500 metres en route.

On 3 June 1967, in Chiswick, London, Smith broke two world records in one race, these times of 4:17.3 (1500m) and 4:37.0 (mile) were the first records to be officially ratified by the IAAF.

Personal life
Smith worked as a PE teacher at Sacred Heart High School, Hammersmith, Haberdashers' Aske's School for Girls, and Baradene College in Auckland. She died in London on 9 November 1993, aged 52, following a brain haemorrhage.

Achievements
International Championships:

1964: 8th 800 m Olympics

1966: 3rd 880y Commonwealth Games

1968: 4th International CC

1971: 45th International CC (for New Zealand)

UK Internationals: 12 (1963-6)

National Championships: Won WAAA 880y 1964-7.

Personal bests: 440y 56.0 (1967), 800m 2:03.2 (1966), 1500m 4:17.3 (1967), mile 4:37.0 (1967).

References 

British Olympic Association Biog
World record progression at athletix.org

1941 births
1993 deaths
Athletes (track and field) at the 1964 Summer Olympics
English female middle-distance runners
Olympic athletes of Great Britain
Athletes (track and field) at the 1966 British Empire and Commonwealth Games
Athletes (track and field) at the 1970 British Commonwealth Games
Commonwealth Games bronze medallists for England
Commonwealth Games medallists in athletics
People from Amersham
Medallists at the 1966 British Empire and Commonwealth Games